The Boian is a left tributary of the river Inot in Romania. It flows into the Inot in Păgaia.

References

Rivers of Romania
Rivers of Bihor County